Pseudomonas luteola is an opportunistic pathogen, found ubiquitously in damp environments. Originally designated in the genus Chryseomonas, the species has since been reassigned to the genus Pseudomonas.

Morphology
Pseudomonas luteola is a Gram-negative, motile aerobe. Its motility is created by multitrichous flagella. They grow as rods of 0.8 μm to 2.5 μm. Colonies produce a yellow-orange pigment. Optimal temperature for growth is 30 °C. Importantly for classification, it grows best on heart infusion agar supplemented with 5% horse blood. It is also able to grow on TSA, Nutrient Agar, Mac Conkey or CASA Agar.

Biosorption

Pseudomonas luteola can absorb certain heavy metals such as Cr(VI) and Al(III). Both ions are found in industrial wastewaters. These metals are specifically targeted by P. luteola strain TEM05. Under relatively acidic conditions (pH: 4 and 5 for each ion respectively).  Experiments indicated a maximum adsorption capacity of 55.2 mg g−1 for Al(III) and 3.0 mg g−1 for Cr(VI).

This same strain is also known to produce an exopolysaccharide (EPS) utilized in the adsorption of nickel and copper. In order to adsorb Ni and Cu at significant levels, the strain must be immobilized in a calcium alginate beads. With this enhancement, maximum adsorption capacities range from 45.87–50.81 mg g−1 and 52.91–61.73 mg g−1, respectively.

Pathenogenicity

The pathogenic form of Pseudomonas luteola is a saprophyte. It is an opportunistic pathogen that can cause bacteremia, meningitis, prosthetic valve endocarditis, peritonitis in humans and animals. P. luteola is registered by the CDC as group Ve-1. Most strains are susceptible to broad-spectrum antibiotics, such as cephalosporins, aminosids, and ciprofloxacin. However, infections associated with foreign material are highly resistant, and infected prostheses have to be removed if possible.

References

External links
Type strain of Pseudomonas luteola at BacDive –  the Bacterial Diversity Metadatabase

Gram-negative bacteria
Bacteria described in 1985